Keijo Tiitola (born 22 September 1964) is a Finnish biathlete. He competed in the 20 km individual event at the 1984 Winter Olympics.

References

External links
 

1964 births
Living people
Finnish male biathletes
Olympic biathletes of Finland
Biathletes at the 1984 Winter Olympics
People from Pälkäne
Sportspeople from Pirkanmaa